Jeremiah Jordan Romano Lisbo (born November 27, 1997), is a Filipino actor, singer and model. He is most known for appearing in a number of Star Cinema's produced films, including Four Sisters Before the Wedding (2020), Love or Money (2021), He's Into Her (2021), and Love at First Stream (2021).

Lisbo is among the first batch of actors signed under Rise Artists Studio, a newly created talent management arm of Star Cinema.

Career
Lisbo was signed to Star Magic as part of the Star Magic Circle 2019 batch, alongside fifteen other actors, including Belle Mariano and Kyle Echarri. The following year Lisbo made his television debut in the teleserye Make It with You (2020), which starred Enrique Gil and Liza Soberano.

In February 2020, Lisbo was among thirteen young actors selected to be a part of the Rise Artists Studio, a new talent agency developed under Star Cinema. Following this, Lisbo appeared in a number of Star Cinema productions, including the series The Four Bad Boys and Me, where he starred with his fellow Rise Artists Studio actors Kaori Oinuma and Rhys Miguel. Released amidst the COVID-19 pandemic and ABS-CBN shutdown, the show was Star Cinema's first ever digital project and took the form of a hybrid podcast/video series.

In the same year, Lisbo made his film debut in the Mae Cruz-Alviar film Four Sisters Before the Wedding (2020), a prequel to the 2013 film Four Sisters and a Wedding, where he played JP, the love interest of the Belle Mariano character. Lisbo would be paired with Mariano once more in Maalaala Mo Kaya'''s episode "Singsing", which was released the following year.

In 2021, Lisbo appeared in another Cruz-Alviar film, Love or Money. The actor also starred in the iWantTFC series He's Into Her'' (2021), where he played Randall Echavez. As in his previous works, he was again paired with Mariano, but this time as part of a love triangle with the Donny Pangilinan character. The series, which was based on a popular Wattpad novel, debuted to record-breaking viewership.

Filmography

References

External links 
 

 

Filipino male film actors
Filipino male television actors
21st-century Filipino male actors
Filipino male models
ABS-CBN personalities
Star Magic
Living people
1997 births